Dr Otter is a stop-motion animated series created & written by David Bonner and produced by Ealing Animation.
It was shown on CBBC during 2001. There were 3 seasons in all.

Plot 

Dr Melvyn P Otter is the GP for a small group of animals. He lives in a delightful riverside house with his wife, Raylee and his faithful assistant, Flybread (a cat). Each episode, Dr Otter is called upon to tend his little catchment area, which include Mrs Canny Body, Dunston the mole and the Rabbit family, as well as a chameleon called Lucky who comes from Spain.

Characters 

 Dr Otter – is voiced by Rob Rackstraw, who also voices the naughty scarecrow Spud, in "Bob the Builder". He is rather a dapper otter, who always manages to unravel any difficult situations, usually caused by the inexperience of Flybread. He is a kindly soul, trusted by the tiny community.
 Raylee (voiced by Jan Francis) – is his wife, she offers assistance in all the episodes. She is very level headed and calm.
 Flybread – Dr Otter's assistant, has a tendency to arrogance, but he is really somewhat inexperienced and gets himself into amusing little situations, always to be rescued by Dr Otter or Raylee. He has a very "posh" accent.
 Mrs Canny Body – is a delightful old lady who loves to bake cakes for everyone in the community. There is only one problem, they are as hard as concrete and everyone hates them! In at least one episode the cake is used for a completely different purpose to that which was intended. (for instance, a spare tyre!)
 Dunston – is a very old and blind mole who lives alone and finds it hard to manage. He gets very confused, and wears an old holey jumper. He needs help in quite a few of the episodes.
 The Rabbit family – consist of dad Dexley and mum Dandelion. Their brood often get into scrapes, as well as getting mysterious "diseases" that tend to be "solved" quite easily by Dr Otter -(wiping off red spots on faces caused by felt tip pen, etc.)- whilst poor Flybread tends to be poring medical journals for causes of the bogus spots.

As well being voiced by Rob Rackstraw and Jan Francis, the other characters are voiced by Maria Darling and Jimmy Hibbert.

Themes 

Dr Otter is a very gentle medical children's programme that focuses far more on Flybread's attitude and learning about the community, and each episode deals with a minor moral dilemma, rather than a medical one!

Home release
Dr Otter was released on Region 2 And Region 4 DVD on 10 January 2005.

Episodes

Season 1 (2001)

1.Colour Me Lucky

2.Blackberry Surprise

3.Melvyn's Birthday

4.Dr Otter's Mouldy Golf Bag

5.Doctor Donna

6. The Odd-Job Gang

7.Sale of the Century

8.School's Out

9.After The Storm

Season 2 (2001–2002)

1.Stucky Lucky

2.A New Home For Lucky

3.Treasure Hunt

4.Pumpkin Soup

5.Cold Comfort

6.Summer Break

7.Melvyn's Lodgers

8.Oh What A Beotiful Day

9. Things That Go Bump in the Night

Season 3 (2002)

1.Dunston's Spring Clean

2.Statue Over There

3.Crash

4.Best Foot Forward

5.Un-Lucky

6.A Fishy Tale

7. Getting The Needle

8.Mr Bumble

External links 

ToonHound

2001 British television series debuts
2002 British television series endings
2000s British children's television series
2000s British animated television series
2000s preschool education television series
British stop-motion animated television series
British children's animated adventure television series
English-language television shows
BBC children's television shows
CBeebies
Fictional otters
Animated television series about mammals
Television series by Universal Television